Vijayan was an Indian actor, primarily working in Malayalam and Tamil films in the late 1970s.  He died following a cardiac arrest in 2007 while he was shooting for Aayudham Seivom. His wife was the niece of former Chief Minister of Kerala E. K. Nayanar.

Partial filmography

Tamil

Malayalam

Hindi

References

External links
 

Male actors from Kozhikode
Male actors in Tamil cinema
Male actors in Malayalam cinema
Indian male film actors
1944 births
2007 deaths
20th-century Indian male actors
21st-century Indian male actors